Fournès is a commune in the southern French department of Gard.

Population

See also
Communes of the Gard department

References

Communes of Gard